Austroomphaliaster is a fungal genus in the family Tricholomataceae. It is a monotypic genus, containing the single species Austroomphaliaster nahuelbutensis, found in temperate South America.

See also

 List of Agaricales genera
 List of Tricholomataceae genera

References

Tricholomataceae
Monotypic Agaricales genera
Taxa described in 1998